Dagmar Vollmer is a German Paralympic skier. She represented Germany in alpine skiing in four Paralympic Winter Games. She won a total of three medals, including one silver medal and two bronze medals.

Career 
At the 1992 Winter Paralympics in Albertville, France, Vollmer won the bronze medal in the super-G race (with a time of 1:22.18. She placed third, behind the Canadian Caroline Viau in the time of 1:17.70 and the Czech Marcela Mišúnová in 1:21.16. She finished in 6th place in the slalom, in 4th place both in the downhill, and in the giant slalom.

At the 1994 Winter Paralympics, in Lillehammer, Vollmer won two medals (silver in giant slalom LW6 / 8, and bronze in super-G LW6 / 8), and placed fifth in special slalom and downhill. 

At the 1998 Winter Paralympics, in Nagano, Vollmer competed in four events in the LW3,4,6 / 8 and LW3,4,5 / 7,6 / 8 categories, finishing 7th in the downhill and 8th in the supergiant. In both slalom races, giant and special, Vollmer did not achieve significant results. 

At the 2002 Winter Paralympics, in Salt Lake City, Vollmer finished in 5th place in the super-G LW3,4,6 / 8,9, and in the giant slalom LW6 / 8, and 6th place in the downhill LW3,4,6 / 8,9. Vollmer also competed in the slalom race.

References 

Paralympic silver medalists for Germany
Paralympic bronze medalists for Germany
Paralympic alpine skiers of Germany